MTX (short for Metalex) is an automobile company in the Czech Republic, that has been previously in Czechoslovakia engaged in the manufacture of racing and formula cars since 1969. Originally, it was a repair shop for Škoda racers. Currently, MTX is engaged in the development of special vehicle modifications, service activities and veteran renovations. The company now has branches in Prague (headquarters), Plzeň (manufacture) and Mělník (autoservis).

The first single-seater formula car ""MTX 1-01" appeared in 1970. During the 1970s and 1980s, Formula Easter cars, autocross buggies and rally cars (based on Škoda and Lada) were produced. In 1989 - 1990 Škoda Rapid convertible was made in a few copies in cooperation with the German Heinzinger firm. In the 1990s, the company made MTX Roadster (based on Škoda Favorit) and  MTX Cabrio (based on Škoda Felicia). Super-sport model named MTX Tatra V8 was made in 1991. Racing cars from Metalex won 14 international titles and almost 100 titles of national champions.

Formula cars

 MTX 1-01 formula Škoda (1970-1984, produced 35 vehicles)
 MTX 1-02 formula Easter (1972-1975, produced 25 vehicles)
 MTX 1-03 formula Easter (1975-1981, produced 53 vehicles)
 MTX 1-04 formula Easter (1978, produced 1 vehicle)
 MTX 1-05 formula Škoda (1979-1982, produced 9 vehicles)
 MTX 1-06 formula Easter (1981-1982, produced 21 vehicles)
 MTX 1-06 B formula Mondial (1983-1988, produced 18 vehicles)
 MTX 1-07 formula Škoda (1983, produced 1 vehicle)
 MTX 1-08 formula Mondial (1989, only model 1:5)
 MTX 1-09 formula Ford (1989-1990, produced 2 vehicles)
 MTX 1-10 formula Škoda (1989-1990, produced 3 vehicles)

Two-seat racing cars
 MTX 2-01 spider B5 (1972, produced 3 vehicles)
 MTX 2-03 spider B6 (1977-1979, produced 10 vehicles)
 MTX Tatra V8 super-sport (1991-1993, produced 4 vehicles)

Road racing motorcycles
 MTX 3-01 (1977, produced 25 motorcycles)
 MTX 3-02 (1979, produced 12 motorcycles)
 MTX 3-03 (1982, produced 45 motorcycles)
 MTX 3-04 (1986, produced 45 motorcycles)

Off-road motorcycles
 MTX 4-01 (1985-1987, produced 130 motorcycles)

Off road buggy cars
 MTX 2-01 (MTX Škoda Buggy) autocross, 1970, produced 1 vehicle
 MTX 2-02 autocross, 1973, produced 1 vehicle
 MTX 2-04 autocross, 1988
 MTX 1-13 autocross, produced 1 vehicle
 MTX Beach Buggy autocross, 1995–2002, produced around 100 vehicles

Touring racing cars
 Škoda 1000 MB MTX A2 or B5 racing, 1969, produced 2 vehicles
 VAZ 2101 MTX Racing A2 racing, 1972–1974, produced 3 vehicles
 VAZ 2103 MTX Racing A2 racing, 1975, produced 2 vehicles
 VAZ 21011 MTX AP circuits and hills A racing, 1979–1984, produced 28 vehicles
 MTX 5-01 (Lada 2105 MTX Racing A) circuits and hills A racing, 1985, produced 20 vehicles
 MTX 5-02 (Škoda 130 L MTX Racing A) circuits and hills A racing, 1985, produced 15 vehicles
 MTX 5-03 (Škoda 130 L MTX Racing A) circuit school Most, produced 7 vehicles
 MTX 5-04 (Lada VFTS MTX Racing B) circuits and hills B racing, 1984
 MTX 5-05 (Lada Samara MTX Racing A) circuits and hills A racing, 1989
 MTX 5-06 (Škoda Favorit MTX Racing A/H) circuits and hills A racing, 1989

Competition racing cars
 VAZ 2101 MTX Rallye A2 racing, 1974–1975, produced 10 vehicles
 VAZ 2103 MTX Rallye A2 racing, 1975–1977, produced 18 vehicles
 Lada 1600 MTX Rallye A2 racing, 1977–1982, produced 80 vehicles
 Lada MTX Rallye A5 A5 racing, 1976, produced 3 vehicles
 MTX 6-01 (Škoda 120 LS MTX Rallye) Škoda 120 racing, 1982–1985, produced 110 vehicles
 MTX 6-02 (Lada VFTS MTX Rallye) B racing, 1983, produced 24 vehicles
 MTX 6-03 (Škoda MTX 160 RS) B racing, in 1984 produced 3 vehicles, based on Škoda Garde with Lada 1600 engine
 MTX 6-04 (Lada 2105 MTX Rallye) A racing, 1984, produced 30 vehicles
 MTX 6-05 (Škoda 130 L MTX Rallye) A racing, 1985, produced 130 vehicles
 MTX 6-06 (Škoda 130 LR MTX Rallye) B racing, 1985, produced 20 vehicles
 MTX 6-07 (Škoda 130 L MTX Rallye) A racing "kit" 
 MTX 6-09 (Škoda Favorit MTX Rallye) A racing
 MTX 6-10 (Moskvič Aleko 2141 MTX Rallye) A racing

Special cars
 MTX 160 RZP-T two modified VAZ-2101 for fast assistance, 1977-1978
 UAZ 469 MTX modified UAZ-469 designed for shows, 1980
 Volha M 24/02 accident car
 Škoda 130 MTX-JP modified car for the "Peace and friendship festival", 1985
 MTX 7-01 (Avia A20F) car for noise measurement
 MTX 7-02 (Avia A30) cable car
 MTX 7-03 (Škoda 1203 MV) accident car
 MTX 7-04 (Škoda 130 SP-MTX) road technical assistance, modified was 20 cars
 MTX 7-05 (Škoda Rapid MTX Cabrio) travel convertible
 MTX 7-06 (MTX Roadster) travel roadster, 1991-1996 based on Favorit 136, produced about 200 cars
 MTX 7-07 (Buggy Racer) children buggy
 MTX 7-08 (ALFA) electric car
 MTX 7-09 (Verold Baghira) off-road roadster
 MTX 7-10 (Desta MTX) utility vehicle
 MTX 7-11 (Peugeot MTX Ambulance) ambulance car
 MTX 7-12 (VW MTX Ambulance 2,4D) ambulance car
 MTX 7-16 (Škoda Felicia MTX Cabrio) travel convertible, 1997-2000

See also
 Tatra (company)

References

External links 

 MTX spol. s r.o.

http://auta5p.eu/katalog/mtx/mtx.htm  (in Czech)

Vehicle manufacturing companies established in 1969
Manufacturing companies based in Prague
Car manufacturers of the Czech Republic
Sports car manufacturers
Czech brands